This article displays the rosters for the teams competing at the 2017 Women's EuroHockey Nations Championship. Each team had to submit 18 players.

Pool A

Belgium
The following 18 players were selected in the Belgium squad.

Head Coach: Niels Thijssen

Czech Republic
The following 18 players were selected in the Czech Republic squad.

Head Coach: Filip Neusser

Netherlands
The following 18 players were selected in the Netherlands squad.

Head Coach: Alyson Annan

Spain
The following 18 players were selected in the Spain squad.

Head Coach: Adrian Lock

Pool B

England
The following 18 players were selected in the England squad.

Head Coach: David Ralph

Germany
The following 18 players were selected in the Germany squad.

Head Coach: Jamilon Mülders

Ireland
The following 18 players were selected in the Ireland squad.

Head Coach: Graham Shaw

Scotland
The following 18 players were selected in the Scotland squad.

Head Coach: Graham Shaw

References

Squads
2017